Max Svensson (born 19 June 1998) is a Swedish footballer who plays for Dutch club Willem II. He is mainly a left winger.

Club career
He made his Allsvenskan debut for Helsingborgs IF on 16 July 2016 in a game against GIF Sundsvall. He moved to Willem II in July 2021 on a three-year contract.

References

External links
 
 
 Career stats & Profile - Voetbal International

1998 births
Living people
Swedish footballers
Association football wingers
Sweden youth international footballers
Sweden under-21 international footballers
Helsingborgs IF players
Willem II (football club) players
Allsvenskan players
Superettan players
Eredivisie players
Swedish expatriate footballers
Expatriate footballers in the Netherlands
Swedish expatriate sportspeople in the Netherlands